Clare Frances de Lore, Lady McKinnon (born 1960) is a New Zealand journalist.

De Lore grew up in Riccarton in Christchurch, and attended St Teresa's School and Villa Maria College. After completing a journalism course, she worked at Radio New Zealand and in the State Services Commission. She is the author of Every Kitchen Tells a Story, a book of interviews of mainly women about their kitchens. From 2010, de Lore has been Rwanda's Honorary Consul General to New Zealand, and is an International Ambassador for Hope and Homes for Children, a charity working in 13 countries in eastern Europe and Africa.

De Lore married New Zealand politician Don McKinnon in 1995, and they have one son.

References

1960 births
Living people
New Zealand women journalists
People educated at Villa Maria College, Christchurch
People from Christchurch